Thalassotalea marina  is a Gram-negative and facultatively anaerobic bacterium from the genus of Thalassotalea which has been isolated from a recirculating aquaculture system in Tianjin in China.

References

 

Alteromonadales
Bacteria described in 2015